The 1865 Minnesota gubernatorial election was held on November 7, 1865 to elect the governor of Minnesota.

Results

References

1865
Minnesota
gubernatorial
November 1865 events